Deans of Columbia Law School:

References

See also
Law school dean

Law